AWS Graviton is a 64-bit ARM-based CPU designed by AWS, an Amazon subsidiary. The first version was launched at AWS's customer event, re:Invent 2018. The second generation, AWS Graviton2, was launched in December 2019. AWS states that Graviton2 delivers up to 40% improved price/performance over the same generation M5, C5, and R5 instances and an average of 72% reduction in power consumption.

Graviton

The first Graviton CPU has 16 Cortex A72 cores, with ARMv8-A ISA including Neon, crc, crypto.  The vCPUs are physical cores in a single NUMA domain, running at 2.3 GHz. It also includes hardware acceleration for floating-point math, SIMD, plus AES, SHA-1, SHA-256, GCM, and CRC-32 algorithms.

One EC2 instance uses the original Graviton CPU: A1.

Graviton2

The Graviton2 CPU has 64 Neoverse-N1 cores, with ARMv8.2-A ISA including 2x128 bit Neon, LSE, fp16, rcpc, dotprod, crypto. The vCPUs are physical cores in a single NUMA domain, running at 2.5 GHz. 

EC2 products that include Graviton2: M6g, M6gd, C6g, C6gd, C6gn, R6g, R6gd, T4g, X2gd, G5g, Im4gn, Is4gen. One or more of these instances are available in 28 AWS regions.

Graviton3

The Graviton3 CPU has 64 Neoverse-V1 cores, with ARMv8.4-A ISA including 4x128 bit Neon, LSE, 2x256 bit SVE, rng, bf16, int8, crypto. Organized in a single NUMA domain, all vCPUs are physical cores running at 2.6 GHz.  

EC2 products that include Graviton3: C7g, C7gn, HPC7g.

Graviton3 provides up to 25% better compute performance, up to 2x higher floating-point performance, up to 2x faster cryptographic workload performance, up to 3x better performance for ML workloads including support for bfloat16, and 50% more memory bandwidth compared to AWS Graviton2 processors. Graviton3-based instances use up to 60% less energy for the same performance than comparable EC2 instances. 

Graviton3E is a higher power version of Graviton3.

Reason behind creating

David Brown, VP of EC2 at AWS in 2020 said, that some customers were not using their EC2 instances at full capacity. After listening to customers such as SmugMug and Flickr, AWS added to their X86-64 family of processors an Arm based option for their servers for several reasons: 

 Offer more choice in terms of selection of EC2 instances for customers 
 Target Arm-based applications
 Provide high availability and security, while reducing virtualization costs
 Offer decent server performance with lower prices for customers

Graviton1 reached these goals. Graviton2 now offers better performance compared to X86: 
35% faster running Redis, 30% faster running Apache Cassandra, and up to 117%  higher throughput for MongoDB. In addition to higher performance, Graviton offers 70% lower power consumption  and 20% lower price.

See also

 Developed by Annapurna Labs, part of the AWS organization.
 Timeline of Amazon Web Services for launch dates.

References

External links 

 
 AWS: AWS Graviton Technical Guide
 Dev.to: Large System Extensions for AWS Graviton Processors
 Arm: Gain up to 35% performance benefits for deploying Redis on AWS Graviton2
 Arm: Gain up to 30% Cost-Performance benefits for Apache Kafka on AWS Graviton2 Processors
 AWS: AWS Lambda Functions Powered by AWS Graviton2 Processor – Run Your Functions on Arm and Get Up to 34% Better Price Performance
 AWS: Announcing AWS Graviton2 Support for AWS Fargate – Get up to 40% Better Price-Performance for Your Serverless Containers

ARM-based systems on chips
Amazon (company) hardware
Amazon Web Services